Cecil Valentine De Vere (14 February 1846 in London – 9 February 1875 in Torquay) was the winner of the first official British Chess Championship in 1866.

He was born Valentine John Cecil De Vere Mathews in 1846. It is likely that he was the illegitimate son of William Cecil De Vere, a naval officer and son of the second Baronet of Curragh. His mother was Katherine Mathews, a Welsh-born household servant. He played chess effortlessly and elegantly without recourse to chess study or theory; in this respect he was not unlike José Raúl Capablanca. His meteoric rise to fame and equally dramatic decline has been compared to Paul Morphy and he is often cited as 'The English Morphy'. His great natural talent for the game was attended by an equal indolence for work. Cecil De Vere contracted tuberculosis around 1867 and later became dependent on alcohol. He lived in London for most of his life but was sent to Torquay by his chess friends in 1874 in the vain hope of recuperation. He died in Torquay, UK, aged 28, and is buried there.

References

External links
 Article on J H Blackburne with section on C V De Vere
 Chesscenter.com
 
 John Henderson – report on round 3 of 2001 British Championship includes a section on De Vere and the book by Owen Hindle and Bob Jones

1846 births
1875 deaths
British chess players
19th-century chess players